Alan Fraser (13 July 1892 — 28 August 1962) was a Scottish first-class cricketer.

Fraser was born at Perth in July 1892. He was educated at Merchiston Castle School. He played club cricket for Perthshire until 1913, before moving to Forfarshire in 1914. He served in the British Army during the First World War with the Mechanised Transport Corps. Following the war, he resumed playing club cricket for Forfarshire and was selected to play for Scotland in a first-class cricket match against Ireland at Dublin in 1921. Batting once in the match, he was dismissed for 9 runs in the Scottish first innings by Wentworth Allen. He bowled seven wicketless overs in the Irish first innings. He was described by the Perthshire Advertiser in 1924 as a "great slip fielder". Having captained Forfarshire, he resigned the captaincy in 1927. 

Fraser was president of Forfarshire Cricket Club during the Second World War and was instrumental in the continuation of cricket in the county, with matches played at Forthill. Outside of cricket, he was the managing director of Peter McIntyre Ltd., auctioneers and live stock salesmen. Fraser died at Dundee in August 1962. His brother was the cricketer and rugby union player William Lovat Fraser.

References

External links
 

1892 births
1962 deaths
People from Perth, Scotland
People educated at Merchiston Castle School
British Army personnel of World War I
Scottish cricketers
Scottish auctioneers
20th-century Scottish businesspeople